K. S. Puttannaiah (23 December 1949 – 18 February 2018) was an Indian politician.

Born in Kyathanahalli village, Mandya district on 23 December 1949, Puttannaiah attended St. Philomena College and earned a bachelor's degree from D. Banumaiah College. He became a karyakarta of the Karnataka Rajya Raitha Sangha in August 1983. Puttannaiah ran for a seat on the Karnataka Legislative Assembly in 1994, serving Pandavapura until 1999. Later that year, he was named president of Karnataka Rajya Raitha Sangha. While president of Karnataka Rajya Raitha Sangha, Puttannaiah contested three Karnataka Legislative Assembly elections and one Lok Sabha election, all of which he lost. He has been a hero to farmers and has saved thousands of farmers from having suicides. K.S. Puttannaiah has left his entire family to his wife, to take care of. He had a brother, K.S. Ramesh who died in 2006. This man has sacrificed so much in order to lead the farmers for higher pay and lower suicides. Being a farmer himself he knew the struggles they have to go through. He loved dramas and did them a lot when he was young. His wife was Sunitha Puttannaiah, two daughters Smitha Puttannaiah and Akshatha Puttannaiah, one son, Darshan Puttannaiah.  In 2013, he ran in the Melkote constituency, representing the Sarvodaya Karnataka Paksha. Puttannaiah had a heart attack on 18 February 2018 while watching Kabaddi at Visvesvaraya Stadium in Mandya. He was declared dead after being sent to the Mandya Institute of Medical Sciences. Puttannaiah's funeral, held on 22 February 2018 in Kyathanahalli, was attended by several thousand people.

References

1949 births
2018 deaths
Karnataka MLAs 1994–1999
Karnataka MLAs 2013–2018
People from Mandya district
Indian farmers
Janata Dal (Secular) politicians